Oithona is a planktonic crustacean genus found in marine, brackish, fresh water environments. Oithona has been described as the most ubiquitous and abundant copepod in the world's oceans. It was first described by Baird in 1843 using the species Oithona plumifera as taxon type.

The following species are recognized:

 Oithona aculeata Farran, 1913
 Oithona alvarezi Lindberg, 1955
 Oithona amazonica Burckhardt, 1913
 Oithona aruensis Früchtl, 1923
 Oithona atlantica Farran, 1908
 Oithona attenuata Farran, 1913
 Oithona australis Nishida, 1986
 Oithona bjornbergae Ferrari F.D. & Bowman, 1980
 Oithona bowmani Rocha C.E.F., 1986
 Oithona brevicornis Giesbrecht, 1891
 Oithona colcarva Bowman, 1975
 Oithona cruralis Nishida, Tanaka & Omori, 1977
 Oithona davisae Ferrari F.D. & Orsi, 1984
 Oithona decipiens Farran, 1913
 Oithona dissimilis Lindberg, 1940
 Oithona erythrops Brady, 1915
 Oithona fallax Farran, 1913
 Oithona farrani (Brady, 1915)
 Oithona flemingeri (Ferrari & Bowman, 1980)
 Oithona fonsecae Ferrari & Bowman, 1980
 Oithona fragilis Nishida, 1979
 Oithona frigida Giesbrecht, 1902
 Oithona gessneri Kiefer, 1954
 Oithona hamata Rosendorn, 1917
 Oithona hebes Giesbrecht, 1891
 Oithona horai Sewell, 1934
 Oithona linearis Giesbrecht, 1891
 Oithona longispina Nishida, Tanaka & Omori, 1977
 Oithona minuta Scott T., 1894
 Oithona minuta Krichagin, 1877
 Oithona nana Giesbrecht, 1893
 Oithona nishidai McKinnon, 2000
 Oithona oswaldocruzi Oliveira, 1945
 Oithona pacifica (Nishida, 1985)
 Oithona parvula (Farran, 1908)
 Oithona plumifera Baird, 1843
 Oithona pseudofrigida Rosendorn, 1917
 Oithona pseudovivida Shuvalov, 1980
 Oithona pulla (Farran, 1913)
 Oithona robertsoni McKinnon, 2000
 Oithona robusta Giesbrecht, 1891
 Oithona rostralis Nishida, Tanaka & Omori, 1977
 Oithona setigera (Dana, 1849)
 Oithona similis Claus, 1866
 Oithona simplex Farran, 1913
 Oithona splendens Baird, 1843
 Oithona tenuis Rosendorn, 1917
 Oithona vivida Farran, 1913
 Oithona wellershausi Ferrari F.D., 1982
 Oithona abbreviata (Dana, 1849) (taxon inquirendum, listed as "Unbestimmbare Species" by Giesbrecht, 1892)
 Oithona alia (Kiefer, 1935) accepted as Oithona rigida Giesbrecht, 1896 accepted as Dioithona rigida (Giesbrecht, 1896) (synonym according to Nishida, 1985)
 Oithona canhanhae Oliveira, 1945 accepted as Oithona hebes Giesbrecht, 1891 (placed in synonymy by da Rocha, 1986)
 Oithona challengeri Brady, 1883 accepted as Oithona setigera (Dana, 1849) (listed as synonym by Nishida, 1985)
 Oithona helgolandica (Claus, 1863) accepted as Oithona similis Claus, 1866
 Oithona neotropica Herbst, 1967 accepted as Oithona oswaldocruzi Oliveira, 1945 (placed in synonymy by da Rocha, 1986)
 Oithona oculata Farran, 1913 accepted as Dioithona oculata (Farran, 1913) (synonym )
 Oithona oligohalina Fonseca & Björnberg T.K.S., 1976 accepted as Oithona oswaldocruzi Oliveira, 1945 (placed in synonymy by da Rocha, 1986)
 Oithona oraemaris Oliveira, 1946 accepted as Oithona hebes Giesbrecht, 1891 (placed in synonymy by da Rocha, 1986)
 Oithona ovalis Herbst, 1955 accepted as Oithona hebes Giesbrecht, 1891 (placed in synonymy by da Rocha, 1986)
 Oithona ovata Lindberg, 1950 accepted as Oithona attenuata Farran, 1913 (synonymised by Nishida, 1985)
 Oithona pelagica Farran, 1908 accepted as Oithona setigera (Dana, 1849) (listed as synonym by Nishida, 1985)
 Oithona plumosa Lindberg, 1947 accepted as Oithona nana Giesbrecht, 1893 (synonymised  by Nishida, 1985)
 Oithona pygmaea Boeck, 1865 accepted as Oithona similis Claus, 1866 (listed as probable synonym by Giesbrecht, 1892)
 Oithona rigida Giesbrecht, 1896 accepted as Dioithona rigida (Giesbrecht, 1896)
 Oithona sapucaiae Oliveira, 1945 accepted as Oithona hebes Giesbrecht, 1891 (placed in synonymy by da Rocha, 1986)
 Oithona scriba (Dana, 1849) accepted as Oithona plumifera Baird, 1843 (listed as synonym by Giesbrecht, 1892)
 Oithona sinensis Burckhardt, 1912 accepted as Limnoithona sinensis (Burckhardt, 1913)
 Oithona spinifrons Boeck, 1865 accepted as Oithona similis Claus, 1866
 Oithona spinirostris Claus, 1863 accepted as Oithona setigera (Dana, 1849) (listed as synonym by Nishida, 1985)
 Oithona spinulosa Lindberg, 1950 accepted as Oithona brevicornis Giesbrecht, 1891 (synonym according to Nishida & Ferrari, 1983)
 Oithona tropica Wolfenden, 1906 accepted as Oithona setigera (Dana, 1849) (listed as synonym by Nishida, 1985)

References 

Cyclopoida genera